Edmund Ford (by 1524 – 1568/79), of Harting, Sussex, was an English politician.

He was a Member (MP) of the Parliament of England for Midhurst in 1547.

References

16th-century deaths
English MPs 1547–1552
People from Harting
Year of birth uncertain
People from Midhurst